Zhaoge is an upcoming Chinese television series written and produced by Yu Zheng; starring Zhang Zhehan and Wu Jinyan. The series is set in the later years of Shang dynasty, and revolves around Ji Fa's life as a hostage in Zhaoge and his journey to become a legendary ruler. It involves fantasy elements originating from the 16th-century novel Investiture of the Gods.

Synopsis
During the Shang dynasty, the capital of China was moved to Zhaoge in the hopes that the city would grow prosperous.  However, by the reign of King Zhou of Shang, the livelihood of the people was driven into a desperate state due to warfare. Thankfully, the son of King Zhou of Shang, also had the son of King Wen of Zhou, Ji Kao, in his hands. Ji Kao was on good terms with the son of King Zhou, Yin Jiao, who wished to save the people from their plight. Ji Kao eventually set up and degraded to the status of a slave but was saved by Yin Jiao. While fleeing, Ji Kao met Jiang Ziya, Nezha, and Yang Jian who assisted him.

Years later, Ji Kao had changed names to Ji Fa and led eight hundred feudal princes to suppress King Zhou, leading to the destruction of the Shang dynasty.  Yin Jiao turned on Ji Fa, who he accused of leading his mother to her death.  This eventually led to Yin Jiao’s suicide.  Ji Fa eventually ascended and became King Wu of Zhou, remembering to keep in mind his shared dream with Yin Jiao to lift the people towards a better future.

Cast

Production
Shooting began on September 13, 2016 in Kanas Lake, Xinjiang Uygur Autonomous Region. The series wrapped up filming on February 7, 2017 at Hengdian. The series reportedly took 300 million yen to produce, with six months of filming and eight months of pre-production.

The series is written and produced by Yu Zheng, who also works as the art director. Directors Liu Zhenming and Ren Haiyao previously worked with Yu in the web series Demon Girl. Lun Pengbo who worked on Mojin: The Lost Legend acts as the visual effects director, and He Jian of The Glory of Tang Dynasty was appointed the costumes designer. Yu Zheng also engaged history professors, host of Lecture Room and archaeology professors to ensure that the television series is as accurate to real-life history as possible.

References

2020 Chinese television series debuts
Chinese historical television series
Shenmo television series
Television shows written by Yu Zheng
Television series by Cathay Media
Television series by Huanyu Film
Television series set in the Shang dynasty
Television series set in the Zhou dynasty
Upcoming television series
Works set in the 11th century BC